Pastorale (Georgian: Pastorali / პასტორალი), is a Soviet film shot in Georgia in 1975 and directed by Otar Iosseliani.

Like all Georgian productions of that period, Pastorale was filmed in the Georgian language and then dubbed in Russian for other Soviet republics.

Synopsis
In Georgia, four musicians and their manager arrive at a village to prepare in secluded silence for their next pastoral music concert. The host's children prepare the upper floor of the house for their guests. In this way, with the musicians coming home and participating in the life in the village, sections from daily life are presented with a poetic expression.  Musicians and villagers look at each other in amazement, thinking how different ways of life they are.

At the end of the film, an apple tree blooming in spring indicates that life in the village will continue unchanged.

Filming technique
The most important feature is that the sounds of life are heard in detail throughout the entire film. Sometimes the music playing is a complementary element, and even the intervening dialogues do not break this integrity.

Awards
 International Critics' Prize from the Berlin Film Festival (1982)

Bibliography
 Ein Sommer auf dem Dorf, Lexikon des internationalen Films, Filmdienst, Access date: 19 May 2022 
 Pastorali, Dennis-Schwartz-Reviews, 09/01/2008

References

External links
 

 1975 films
Soviet-era films from Georgia (country)
Kartuli Pilmi films